Maxime Yegnong (born 13 January 1994) is a Cameroonian boxer. He competed in the men's super heavyweight event at the 2020 Summer Olympics.

References

External links
 

1994 births
Living people
Cameroonian male boxers
Olympic boxers of Cameroon
Boxers at the 2020 Summer Olympics
Place of birth missing (living people)
Boxers at the 2022 Commonwealth Games
21st-century Cameroonian people